HMS Nautilus was a Royal Navy submarine. She was the largest submarine built for the Royal Navy at the time. She was also the first to be given a name.

The resulting design changed from the saddle tanks common at the time to a double hull.

The order was given to Vickers in 1912 and her keel was laid down in March 1913. Although launched in 1914 it took until 1917 to complete the vessel. Nautilus spent most of her life with the 1st Submarine Flotilla at Portsmouth as a depot ship and later as a battery charging vessel. She was renamed N1 in June 1917.

Following decommissioning she was sold for scrap to John Cashmore Ltd on 9 June 1922 and broken up at their yard at Newport, Wales.

References

Publications

See also
List of submarines of the Royal Navy

Nautilus
1914 ships
Ships built in Barrow-in-Furness